The Ava Bridge is a 16 span simply supported bridge between Ava and Sagaing, Mandalay Division, Burma. It was built by the British in 1934. The bridge was destroyed by the retreating British Army during World War II and was rebuilt in 1954 after Burmese independence. It was the only bridge to span the Irrawaddy River until recent times, when a spate of bridge construction has been carried out by the government, including the new Irrawaddy Bridge.

References

Railway bridges in Myanmar
Buildings and structures in Mandalay Region